Kalandar pass (el. 17,130 ft.) is a high mountain pass that connects Karambar river valley (upper Gilgit valley) in Ishkoman tehsil of Ghizer district in the Northern Areas of Pakistan with Wakhan Corridor in Afghanistan.

Mountain passes of Afghanistan
Wakhan
Afghanistan–Pakistan border
Mountain passes of Gilgit-Baltistan
Landforms of Badakhshan Province